Gastón Orlando Magnetti (born 19 January 1985) is an Argentine-Spanish footballer who plays for Swiss club FC Collina d'Oro as a centre-forward.

External links
 

1985 births
Living people
Argentine footballers
Association football forwards
Ferro Carril Oeste footballers
AC Bellinzona players
FC Chiasso players
SC Kriens players
Swiss Challenge League players
Swiss 1. Liga (football) players
2. Liga Interregional players
Swiss Promotion League players
Argentine expatriate footballers
Expatriate footballers in Switzerland
Argentine expatriate sportspeople in Switzerland